The Coumiac Formation is a geologic formation in France. It preserves fossils dated to the Devonian period.

The Global Boundary Stratotype Section and Point (GSSP) for the base of the Famennian Stage of the Devonian is located at Coumiac quarry  near Cessenon-sur-Orb.

See also

 List of fossiliferous stratigraphic units in France

References

 

Devonian France
Devonian southern paleotemperate deposits